Giovanni Ramos-Godoy (born April 15, 1995) is an American soccer player.

Career

College and amateur
Ramos-Godoy began playing college soccer at California State University, Bakersfield in 2013, before transferring in 2016 to University of California, Irvine where he played for two years and in 2017 was named Big West Conference Offensive Player of the Year.

Professional
On March 12, 2018, Ramos-Godoy signed with United Soccer League side Orange County SC.

In April 2021, Ramos-Godoy joined National Independent Soccer Association side Stumptown AC ahead of the spring 2021 season. After making nine appearances, including three in the Legend's Cup tournament, the team announced his departure on July 19.

References

External links

1995 births
Living people
American soccer players
Association football forwards
Cal State Bakersfield Roadrunners men's soccer players
UC Irvine Anteaters men's soccer players
Orange County SC players
Stumptown AC players
USL Championship players
National Independent Soccer Association players
People from Watsonville, California
Soccer players from California
Sportspeople from the San Francisco Bay Area